Charlotte Osborne, Duchess of Leeds (16 March 1776 – 30 July 1856), formerly Lady Charlotte Townshend, was the wife of George Osborne, 6th Duke of Leeds.

She was the daughter of George Townshend, 1st Marquess Townshend, by his second wife, the former Anne Montgomery.

Personal life 
On 17 August 1797, Osborne married the duke, then Marquess of Carmarthen, at East Rainham in Kent. In 1799 Osborne's husband became duke, and therefore, she became a duchess. They had three children:

Francis Godolphin Osborne, 7th Duke of Leeds (1798–1859), who married Louisa Catherine Caton and had children.
Lady Charlotte Mary Anne Georgiana Osborne (c. 1806–1836), who married Sackville Lane-Fox and had children.
Lord Conyers George Thomas William Osborne (1812–1831)

The Duke of Leeds died in 1838, aged 62, to be succeeded by their son, Francis. The Duchess of Leeds died in July 1856, aged 80.

Arms

References

External links
Guide to the George Townshend, Marquis Townshend, and Charlotte, Lady Townshend Collection 1763-1810 at the University of Chicago Special Collections Research Center

1776 births
1856 deaths
English duchesses by marriage
Daughters of British marquesses